Chung Doo-un (정두언, 6 March 1957 – 16 July 2019) was a South Korean politician who was Vice-Mayor of Seoul from 2000 to 2003.

Chung, along with Chu ho-young and Park Heong-joon, was a close associate of President Lee Myung-bak but later became critical of him and the leadership of the Grand National Party after Lee's election. On 26 August 2011, he described Lee Myung-bak's fair society governance as a failure due to the prime minister-led surveillance against civilians in 2010.

The Minjoo Party's Kim Young-ho took his seat in the National Assembly at the 20th general election, held on 13 April 2016.

Death 
Chung committed suicide, aged 62, in a park in Seoul on 16 July 2019.

References

External links
  Twitter
  Naver blog
  Tistory blog 

1957 births
2019 deaths
Georgetown University alumni
Kookmin University alumni
Lee Myung-bak
Liberty Korea Party politicians
Members of the National Assembly (South Korea)
People from Seoul
South Korean politicians who committed suicide
Seoul National University alumni
2019 suicides
Suicides in South Korea